The Élan DP04 is a small sports prototype race car, designed, developed, and produced by American manufacturer Élan Motorsport, in collaboration and partnership with Van Diemen, for the IMSA Prototype Challenge, between 2006 and 2012.

References 

Sports prototypes
Panoz vehicles